The Pyongyang trolleybus system forms part of the public transport network of Pyongyang, the capital city of North Korea, and extends to some of its suburbs.

History 
The first plans for a trolleybus network were proposed in 1957, though construction only began in 1960, after Kim Il-sung ordered it. The network begun operation on 30 April 1962, with an opening ceremony at Pyongyang Railway station to commemorate the opening of the line from the Three Revolutions Exhibition at Ryonmot-dong to the railway station. The network began without a depot; trolleybuses were parked in the open. In September 1963, the Pyongyang station to Arch of Triumph. In the second half of 1964, a line from Moranbong to Palgol opened. By the end of 1964, the fleet consisted 130 Chollima-9.11 and 24 Chollima 9.25 articulated trolleybuses. Two lines opened in 1965: from Pyongyang station to West Pyongyang on 6 April and from Department Store No. 1 to Taedonggang station on 25 August. During that time, there were also alleged plans for the construction of an intercity line to Pyongsong. Since then, a number of routes have been abolished, replaced by the tram system, though with the closure of tram line 1 from Songsin to Songyo, this section was rebuilt as a trolleybus line. The system is continuously developed, with a new depot serving line 1 and 10 vehicles built in 2016.

The first closures occurred in the 1970s, due to the opening of the Pyongyang Metro. This was followed by a resurgence in the 1980s, when four new routes opened. Closures occurred again in the 1990s due to the opening of the tram network in Pyongyang.page:77 

Between 1996 and 2005, part of the trolleybus line in Pyongsong was cut off from the rest of the line, with the area where the line belonged to being transferred to Unjong-guyok of Pyongyang.

During the 2022 Day of the Sun celebrations, a new line from Songyo to Songhwa was opened, while the line from West Pyongyang to Thermal Power was rerouted, both to serve the new Songhwa and Kyongru-dong residentials districts that they respectively pass through, providing convenient transport to the residents of the new districts.

Services 
There are a total of 10 lines in operation. Some former lines were replaced by the tram system that opened in 1989. The numbers indicated on the dashboard are not route numbers – they are the stopping pattern of that service. This was implemented in July 1972, when Kim Il-sung sought to reduce traffic jams of trolleybuses, after trolleybus headways were decreased in 1 minute in April 1972.page:75

Fleet
Most of the vehicles used on the system are North Korean made; some of them based on the Czech Karosa buses. The fleet also includes Hungarian Ikarus trolleybuses, imported as diesel buses and later reconstructed into trolleybuses.

For the full list including vehicles in use in other cities, see Trolleybuses in North Korea. The only trolleybus operated in Pyongyang that was not manufactured by Pyongyang Trolleybus Factory was a single Jipsan-85 articulated trolleybus.

New rolling stock

New trolleybuses are also produced in other provinces and cities, such as in Chongjin.

Despite the new technology incorporated with the new trolleybuses such as a dual power supply using a battery as a backup and LED displays, they do not have air conditioning. 

The new trolleybuses were subject to news coverage in the Rodong Sinmun, receiving multiple front page headlines subjecting the tests. Kim Jong-un also made visits to the Pyongyang Trolley Bus Factory, with the intention to turn the factory 'into a world-class trolley bus producer'. The first visit in February featured the Chollima-316 trolleybus, while the August visit featured the Chollima-321 trolleybus.

In total, about 200 Chollima-091 were manufactured, about twenty Chollima-316 and at least 40 Chollima-321 were produced.

See also

List of trolleybus systems
Pyongyang Metro
Pyongyang tram system
Trams and trolleybuses in North Korea
Transportation in North Korea

References

External links

Trolleybus city: Pyongyang (North Korea) at Trolleymotion (German, with automated translation to English and other languages available on-site) 
Map of Pyongyang Trolleybus. Transphoto.

Transport in Pyongyang
Pyongyang
Pyongyang